Halihan Hill is a ridge located in the Catskill Mountains of New York east-northeast of Stony Hollow. Jockey Hill is located west and Mount Marion is located north-northeast of Halihan Hill.

References

Mountains of Ulster County, New York
Mountains of New York (state)